T&C may refer to: 

 Technology and Culture, a journal about the history of technology
 Taiyō to Ciscomoon, later known as T&C Bomber, a Japanese girl band
 T & C Tower, or Tuntex Sky Tower, a skyscraper in Taiwan

See also
 Ts&Cs (terms and conditions)